Mwatisi is a river of Tanzania. It flows through the Mbeya Region.

See also
Mount Rungwe - Tanzania

References

External links

Rivers of Tanzania